Dynamic Manta, formerly Proud Manta and Noble Manta, is an annual military exercise held by NATO that "aimed at testing submarine warfare and anti-submarine warfare capabilities. It provides a framework for naval forces to maintain high readiness and ability to operate together." It takes place primarily in the Mediterranean Sea and has been held since approximately 2006.

Dynamic Manta 2021

References 

NATO military exercises